was a feudal domain under the Tokugawa shogunate of Edo period Japan, located in Shimotsuke Province (modern-day Tochigi Prefecture), Japan. It was centered on Ōtawara Castle in what is now part of the city of Ōtawara, Tochigi. Ōtawara was ruled through all of its history by the Ōtawara clan.

History
The Ōtawara clan was a branch of the Nasu clan, and was one of the seven Gōzoku samurai bands of the Nasu region of northern Shimotsuke Province. In 1590, when Toyotomi Hideyoshi called upon the Nasu clan to assist in his plan to destroy the Hōjō clan at the Battle of Odawara, the Nasu refused his summons; however, Ōtawara Harukiyo went against his overlord and pledged allegiance to Hideyoshi. In return, he was awarded a 7,000 koku holding.  In 1600, Ōtawara Harukiyo pledged his forces to Tokugawa Ieyasu and fought a rear-guard action against the Uesugi clan while Ieyasu was at the Battle of Sekigahara. In return for this action, he was awarded another 5,000 koku and was thus admitted into the ranks of the daimyō.

The Ōtawara continued to rule these holdings until the end of the Tokugawa Shogunate. The 3rd daimyō, Ōtawara Takakiyo, gave 1,000 koku to his younger brother, reducing the domain to 11,000 koku. During the Bakumatsu period, the 12th daimyō, Ōtawara Hirokiyo, established a domain academy. The final daimyō, Ōtawara Kazukiyo sided with the imperial forces in the Boshin War, and his castle attacked by pro-Tokugawa Aizu Domain in May 1868.
After the Meiji restoration, he was made a viscount (shishaku) in the kazoku peerage system.
After the abolition of the han system in July 1871, Ōtawara Domain became part of Tochigi Prefecture.

The domain had a population of 12,535 people in 2397 households, of which 608 were samurai per a census in 1870.

Holdings at the end of the Edo period
As with most domains in the han system, Ōtawara Domain consisted of several discontinuous territories calculated to provide the assigned kokudaka, based on periodic cadastral surveys and projected agricultural yields.

Shimotsuke Province
1 villages in Tsuga District
7 villages in Haga District
58 villages in Nasu District
13 villages in Shioya District

List of daimyō

References

External links
   Ōtawara on "Edo 300 HTML"

Notes

Domains of Japan
1600 establishments in Japan
States and territories established in 1600
1871 disestablishments in Japan
States and territories disestablished in 1871
Shimotsuke Province
History of Tochigi Prefecture